Fath Olmobin District is a district (bakhsh) in Shush County, Khuzestan Province, Iran. At the 2006 census, its population was 14,135, in 2,075 families.  The district has one city Saleh Moshatat. The district has two rural districts (dehestan): Chenaneh Rural District and Sorkheh Rural District.

References 

Shush County
Districts of Khuzestan Province